Fictitious person may refer to:

Persona ficta: Legal person
Anyone in List of fictitious people